There have been two baronetcies created for persons with the surname Markham, one in the Baronetage of England and one in the Baronetage of the United Kingdom.

The Markham Baronetcy, of Sedgebrooke in the County of Lincoln, was created in the Baronetage of England on 15 August 1642 for Robert Markham. The Markhams were a prominent family who took their name from Markham, Nottinghamshire and whose lineage extends to Sir Alexander de Markham, who was constable of Nottingham Castle during the time of King Henry III. The second Baronet represented Grantham and Newark in the House of Commons. The third Baronet sat as Member of Parliament for Grantham. The baronetcy became extinct on the death of the fourth Baronet in 1779. Their arms were azure, on a chief or, a semi-lion rampant issuing gules.

The Markham Baronetcy, of Beachborough Park in Newington in the County of Kent, was created in the Baronetage of the United Kingdom on 10 July 1911 for Arthur Markham. He was the founder of the Doncaster Amalgamated Collieries and also represented Mansfield in the House of Commons as a Liberal. The third Baronet was a member of the Legislative Council of Kenya.

The arms for the extant baronetcy are azure on a pale argent three lozenges sable, issuant from a chief engrailed or a demi-lion rampant gules. The motto is Tenax propositi ("firm of purpose").

Markham baronets, of Sedgebrooke (1642)
Sir Robert Markham, 1st Baronet (1597–1667)
Sir Robert Markham, 2nd Baronet (1644–1690)
Sir George Markham, 3rd Baronet (1666–1736)
Sir James John Markham, 4th Baronet (1693–1779)

Markham baronets, of Beachborough Park (1911)
Sir Arthur Basil Markham, 1st Baronet (1866–1916)
Sir Charles Markham, 2nd Baronet (1899–1952)
Sir Charles John Markham, 3rd Baronet (1924–2006)
Sir (Arthur) David Markham, 4th Baronet (born 1950)

The fourth baronet has two daughters. The heir presumptive is his younger brother Richard Barry Markham (born 1954). The heir presumptive's heir presumptive is his elder son, Nicholas Charles Markham (born 1987).

References

Markham
Legislative Council of Kenya
Extinct baronetcies in the Baronetage of England
1911 establishments in the United Kingdom